Massese may refer to:

 Any person, thing or concept from or related to Massa, a town in Tuscany, Italy
 Massese (sheep), a breed of sheep from the Alpi Apuane of the province of Massa Carrara, Italy
 U.S. Massese 1919, a football club in Massa, Tuscany, Italy